Bowling events have been contested at every Asian Games since 1978 Asian Games in Bangkok. After not being included in 1982 and 1990.

Editions

Events

Medal table

List of medalists

List of records

References

Medalists

External links
Sports123

 
Sports at the Asian Games
Asian Games
Asian Games